Pottstown, now referred to as the Charles W. Dickinson Transportation Center, is a bus terminal for the Pottstown Area Rapid Transit located in Pottstown, Pennsylvania. The station was built in 1928 as a train station for the Reading Railroad and was active long enough to be served by SEPTA diesel service trains until 1981. It was added to the National Register of Historic Places on January 12, 1984, as the Reading Railroad Pottstown Station, and is located in the Old Pottstown Historic District, close to the Schuylkill River Trail.

The station was designed in the Classical Revival style by the railroad's engineering staff rather than by an outside architect. Stations built in the nineteenth century by the Reading Railroad had usually been designed by outside architects, including Frank Furness.  During the twentieth century, the railroad became less profitable and most stations were designed in simpler styles in-house.

See also
National Register of Historic Places listings in Montgomery County, Pennsylvania

References

External links
 

Railway stations on the National Register of Historic Places in Pennsylvania
Former Reading Company stations
Former SEPTA Regional Rail stations
Railway stations in the United States opened in 1928
Railway stations closed in 1981
National Register of Historic Places in Montgomery County, Pennsylvania
Former railway stations in Montgomery County, Pennsylvania